Marie Delcourt (Ixelles, 18 November 1891 – Liège, 11 February 1979) was a Belgian classical philologist. She studied at the University of Liège (ULg), and obtained a PhD in classical philology in 1919. Under the German occupation of Belgium during World War I she was active in the Dame Blanche resistance network. She was the first female part-time lecturer at the ULg.

An expert in the history of the ancient Greek religion, Marie Delcourt was particularly interested in the psychological dimension of religious facts. She was also a newspaper columnist and editorialist. She was married to writer Alexis Curvers.

Publications 
Ancient history
 La vie d'Euripide, Éd. Gallimard, Paris, 1930. Rééd. Labor, Bruxelles, 2004, coll. Espace Nord
 Eschyle, Éd. Rieder, Paris, 1934 (Maîtres de Littérature, 18)
 Stérilités mystérieuses et naissances maléfiques dans l'antiquité classique, Éd. Droz, Paris, 1938 (FacPhLLg, 82)
 Périclès, Éd. Gallimard, Paris, 1939 (prix quinquennal de l'essai 1940)
 Légendes et cultes de héros en Grèce, P.U.F., Paris, 1942
 Images de Grèce, Éd. Libris, Brussel, 1943
 Œdipe ou la légende du conquérant, with Conrad Stein, Éd. Fac.Phil.Lett., Liège, 1944, (FacPhLg, 104)
 Translated by Malcolm B. DeBevoise as Oedipus; or, The Legend of a Conqueror (Michigan State University Press, 2020)
 Les grands sanctuaires de la Grèce, P.U.F. 1947 (Mythes et Religions, 21)
 L'oracle de Delphes, Éd. Payot, Paris, 1955
 Héphaistos ou la légende du magicien, Éd. Belles-Lettres, Paris, 1957 (FacPhLLg 146)
 Hermaphrodite, mythes et rites de la bisexualité dans l'antiquité classique, Éd. P.U.F., Paris, 1958 (Mythes et Religions, 36)
 Translated by Jennifer Nicolson as Hermaphrodite: Myths and Rites of the Bisexual Figure in Classical Antiquity (1961)
 Oreste et Alcméon. Étude sur la projection légendaire du matricide en Grèce, Éd. Belles-Lettres, Paris, 1959 (FacPhLLg 151)
 Pyrrhus et Pyrrha. Recherches sur les valeurs du feu dans les légendes helléniques, Éd. Belles-Lettres, Paris 1965, (FacPhLLg 174)
History of humanism
 Thomas More, œuvres choisies, Éd. La Renaissance du livre, Paris, 1936 (Les Cent Chefs-d'œuvre étrangers)
 Érasme, Éd. Libris, Brussels, 1944
Translations 
 Tragiques Grecs. Euripide, Éd. Gallimard, Paris, 1962, (Bibliothèque de la Pléiade)
 Thomas More. L'Utopie, Éd. La Renaissance du Livre, Brussels, 1966
 La correspondance d'Érasme, Collectif, tomes 1, 10, 11, Éd. Presses Académiques Européennes, Bruxelles, 1967–1982
Varia
 Jean Schlumberger, essai critique, Éd. Gallimard, Paris, 1945
 Méthode de cuisine à l'usage des personnes intelligentes, Éd. Baude, Paris-Bruxelles, 1947
 L'autre regard, Ed. Le Cri/Académie royale de langue et de littérature françaises, Brussels, 2004. A collection of her columns from Le Soir.

References

External links 
 Marie Delcourt (French)

1891 births
1979 deaths
People from Ixelles
Belgian academics
Walloon people
University of Liège alumni
Walloon movement activists